The Let L-610 is a prototype aircraft for the Czech civil aircraft manufacturer Let Kunovice made in 1988–1997.

Design and development

In the late 1970s, after the success of the LET L-410 twin engine turboprop, the Soviet airline Aeroflot requested that LET design a replacement for the Antonov An-24 aircraft.

LET's L-610 was designed as a twin engined turboprop aircraft powered by the new Czech engine, Walter M602, with a seating capacity of 40. Flight testing was delayed by engine development taking longer than airframe development. Eventually the 1,358 kW (1,822 shp) turboprop engines were finished and the aircraft first flew on 28 December 1988. No aircraft was ever delivered to any commercial customer, although one aircraft was shown in Aeroflot markings during the Paris Air Show in the 1990s. One Let 610 M was delivered to the Czech Air Force, to support manufacturer's certification and test flights process.

After the Soviet collapse LET tried to westernize the plane in order to widen the aircraft's sales appeal. The result was a new model, known as the L-610G, which had General Electric CT7 engines, Rockwell Collins Pro Line II digital EFIS, weather radar and autopilot. The L-610G prototype flew its maiden flight on 18 December 1992; four years after the L-610M.

During the time that the now-defunct Ayres Corp. owned LET, the aircraft was also known as the Ayres L-610, and for a time was marketed as the Ayres 7000. The customer for the Ayres 7000 was to have been City Connexion Airlines before bankruptcy problems sidelined the program.

On 29 August 2019, the UGMC subsidiary, the Ural Works of Civil Aviation and the Russian regional Polar Airlines signed an agreement to supply ten L-610 aircraft from 2023 to 2025 as part of the regional aviation development program of the Russian Federation. The signing took place at the international aerospace forum MAKS 2019 in Moscow.

Variants
L-610M
Basic variant with Walter M602 engines.
L-610G / Ayres 7000
Variant with General Electric XT7-9D engines.
L-610 MPA
Proposed Anti-submarine warfare variant.

Specifications (L-610)

See also

References

External links

 airliners.net Aircraft Data

Ayres aircraft
1980s Czechoslovakian airliners
L-610
High-wing aircraft
Abandoned civil aircraft projects
Aircraft first flown in 1988
Twin-turboprop tractor aircraft